The  singles Tournament at the 2007 İstanbul Cup took place between 21 and 26 May on outdoor clay courts in İstanbul, Turkey. Elena Dementieva won the title, defeating Aravane Rezaï in the final.

Seeds

Draw

Finals

Top half

Bottom half

Qualifying

Qualifiers
Section 1:  Ekaterina Afinogenova
Section 2:  Anna Tatishvili
Section 3:  Ekaterina Dzehalevich
Section 4:  Anastasija Sevastova

Seeds

First qualifier

Second qualifier

Third qualifier

Fourth qualifier

References

Main and Qualifying Draws

Istanbul Cup - Singles
İstanbul Cup